Yousef Al-Harbi (born 16 March 1997) is a Saudi Arabian footballer who plays as a midfielder for Al-Wehda.

Personal life
He is the son of former Al-Ahli player Saad Mansi Al-Harbi. Al-Harbi's uncle is Khaled Mansi Al-Harbi and his cousin is Rayan Al-Harbi.

Career statistics

Club

Honours
Al-Fayha
King Cup: 2021–22

References

External links
 

1997 births
Living people
Sportspeople from Jeddah
Saudi Arabian footballers
Association football midfielders
Saudi Professional League players
Al-Ahli Saudi FC players
Al-Wehda Club (Mecca) players
Al-Fayha FC players
Saudi Arabia youth international footballers